The Transportation Safety Bureau of Hungary (TSB, KBSZ) is a government agency of Hungary, headquartered in Budapest.

The Minister for Economy and Transport created the agency on 1 February 2006. It investigates air, rail, and marine accidents. Prior to the creation of the TSB, the Civil Aviation Safety Bureau of Hungary (CASB, Hungarian acronym: POLÉBISZ) served as the country's aviation accident investigation agency for four years, when it investigated over five hundred aircraft accidents and incidents.

Offices
Its head office is currently at Laurus Offices (Laurus Irodaház) in Budapest. It was previously in Building 18/A of Terminal 1 of Budapest Ferenc Liszt International Airport.

See also

 National Transport Authority (Hungary)

References

External links
 Transportation Safety Bureau of Hungary
 Transportation Safety Bureau of Hungary 

Government agencies of Hungary
Transport safety organizations
Rail accident investigators
Organizations investigating aviation accidents and incidents
2006 establishments in Hungary
Government agencies established in 2006
Transport organisations based in Hungary